Geert Bekaert (1928–2016) was a Belgian architectural critic and writer on art and design. He was one of the most prolific non-fiction writers in the Dutch language of the late 20th-century. As a young man he was for some years a member of the Society of Jesus.

Bekaert's collected essays were published in nine volumes, 1985–2012. A selection of his essays has been published in English translation under the title Rooted in the Real (Ghent, 2008).

In 2006 Ghent University acquired his library for its Faculty of Engineering and Architecture.

External links
 Geert Bekaert, "Wie over architectuur wil spreken, sta op, en zwijge." Wonen–TABK, June 1983, pp. 10–27. In Dutch. Available online.

References

1928 births
2016 deaths
Belgian non-fiction writers